Jeremy Howe is the editor of long running radio drama The Archers for the BBC since 2018. From 2008, Howe was previously BBC Radio 4's Commissioning Editor for Drama and Fiction.

He was educated at Dulwich College and then studied at Oxford University, worked as a theatre director from 1981-1986 - at York Theatre Royal, The Mercury Theatre, Colchester, Nottingham Playhouse and the Lyric Theatre, Belfast before joining BBC Northern Ireland as a producer of radio drama in 1986.  From 1989 to 1991 he was an Assistant Commissioning editor at Channel 4, where he was in charge of development of Film4. He returned to radio and was managing editor for the drama on Radio 3 before moving back into television as an executive producer for BBC Two 10x10 new directors strand where he gave breaks to Joe Wright, Sarah Gavron, Andrea Arnold, Debbie Isitt, Ian Iqbal Rashid and others, as well as producing documentaries and single dramas like The Falklands Play and This Little Life.

In 2011 he published a memoir - Mummydaddy - about bringing up his two daughters singlehandedly after the tragic death of his first wife, the academic Dr Elizabeth Howe, author of The First English Actresses.

He is now married to the writer and movie producer Jennifer Howarth, whose producing credits include Distant Voices, Still Lives, On the Black Hill and Blame It on the Bellboy.

Response towards Howe’s appointment
Gwyneth Williams, controller of BBC Radio 4 and Radio 4 Extra said: “Jeremy has made an outstanding contribution over many years as Radio 4’s Drama Commissioning Editor.”

References

English radio personalities
Year of birth missing (living people)
Living people
People educated at Dulwich College